Sylvester Schwengle (born 20 July 1988), known as Sylvester, is an Aruban footballer who plays as a striker/attacking midfielder for Aruban Division di Honor club La Fama and a former member of the Aruba national football team. He has 9 caps for national team. His playing position is right wing.

Honours
La Fama
Aruban Division di Honor: 2012–13,

References

External links

1988 births
Living people
People from Oranjestad, Aruba
Aruban footballers
Association football midfielders
SV La Fama players
Aruba international footballers
Aruba under-20 international footballers